Cristian Emanuel Sención Rodríguez (born 28 January 1996) is a Uruguayan footballer who plays as a midfielder for Gualaceo in the Ecuadorian Serie A

References

External links

1996 births
Living people
Uruguayan footballers
Uruguayan expatriate footballers
Association football midfielders
Footballers from Montevideo
Liverpool F.C. (Montevideo) players
Juventud de Las Piedras players
Rampla Juniors players
Albion F.C. players
Uruguayan Primera División players
Uruguayan Segunda División players
Ecuadorian Serie A players
Uruguayan expatriate sportspeople in Ecuador
Expatriate footballers in Ecuador